Michael Robinson is a British figure skater who competed in ice dance.

With partner Catherine Morris, he won bronze at the 1957 European Figure Skating Championships and silver at the 1958 and 1959 European Figure Skating Championships.

Competitive highlights 
With  Catherine Morris

References 

British male ice dancers